Sanhe is a town under the administration of Tianjia'an District, Huainan, Anhui, China. , it has 4 residential communities and 13 villages under its administration.

References 

Township-level divisions of Anhui
Huainan